Chemnitz is one of the three former Direktionsbezirke of Saxony, Germany, located in the south-west of the state. It coincided with the Planungsregion Südsachsen. It was disbanded in March 2012.

History
The Direktionsbezirk Chemnitz came into existence on 1 August 2008, and succeeded the Regierungsbezirk Chemnitz. The territory of the Regierungsbezirk Chemnitz was slightly smaller, and excluded the former district of Döbeln.

Subdivision

Kreise(districts)
Erzgebirgskreis
Mittelsachsen
Vogtlandkreis
Zwickau

Kreisfreie Städte(district-free towns)
Chemnitz

See also 
Bezirk Karl-Marx-Stadt

References

External links 
 

Geography of Saxony
NUTS 2 statistical regions of the European Union
States and territories established in 1991
Former government regions of Germany